The 1996 Japan Series was the Nippon Professional Baseball (NPB) championship series for the 1996 season. It was the 47th Japan Series and featured the Pacific League champions, the Orix BlueWave, against the Central League champions, the Yomiuri Giants. The series was the eighth time the two franchises played each other for the championship; however, the last time the two teams played, Orix was known as the Hankyu Braves. Played at Tokyo Dome and Green Stadium Kobe, the BlueWave defeated the Giants four games to one in the best-of-seven series to win the franchise's 4th Japan Series title. BlueWave slugger and 1996 PL home run leader Troy Neel was named Most Valuable Player of the series. The series was played between October 19 and October 24, 1996, with home field advantage going to the Central League.

Summary

Matchups

Game 1

Game 2

Game 3

Game 4

Game 5

See also
1996 World Series

References

External links
 Nippon Professional Baseball—Official website (in English)

Japan Series
1996 Nippon Professional Baseball season
Orix BlueWave
Yomiuri Giants